Andrew Vlahos (born 20 April 1976) is a former Australian-Greek footballer.

Biography
Andrew Vlahos began his senior career at Heidelberg United FC in the National Soccer League from 1994 to 1996. When Heidelberg and Collingwood Football Club formed to make Collingwood Warriors S.C., Vlahos signed for the new club and spent the season there, scoring 6 times in 24 games. The club consequently disbanded and Vlahos moved on to Carlton S.C. A move overseas followed to Greek giant Panathinaikos F.C. followed, but due to a lack of playing time, Vlahos moved to AO Agios Nikolaos for the 1999–2000 season. After that, Vlahos returned home to South Melbourne FC before moving to Football Kingz FC.

Whilst enjoying previous success in the Belgian Jupiler League with Cercle Brugge, Vlahos decided to return home, to play for Melbourne Victory in the inaugural season of the A-League. Then after returning to Heidelberg United in the Victorian Premier League.

In July 2012 he re-joined South Melbourne FC

In January 2015, Vlahos joined Mill Park SC as the club ambassador.

Andy Vlahos joined Fitzroy City Soccer Club in 2016 taking on the job of Head Senior Coach in the Victorian State 2 North West League.

References

External links
 Andy Vlahos: out in a field of his own 
 
 

1976 births
Living people
Australian people of Greek descent
Soccer players from Melbourne
Australian expatriate soccer players
Expatriate footballers in Belgium
A-League Men players
National Soccer League (Australia) players
Belgian Pro League players
Super League Greece players
Carlton S.C. players
Cercle Brugge K.S.V. players
Football Kingz F.C. players
Melbourne Victory FC players
Panathinaikos F.C. players
Agios Nikolaos F.C. players
South Melbourne FC players
Heidelberg United FC players
Hume City FC players
Expatriate footballers in Greece
Collingwood Warriors S.C. players
Association football forwards
Association football midfielders
Australian soccer players
Australian expatriate sportspeople in Belgium
Australian expatriate sportspeople in Greece
Australian expatriate sportspeople in New Zealand
Expatriate association footballers in New Zealand